Fish moilee/Moily or fish molee (meen molee) is a spicy fish and coconut dish of possible Portuguese or Indian origin. It is common in India, Malaysia and Singapore. During the times of the British Empire, it spread into other places of South-East Asia, such as Singapore.

The name may be associated with a kind of curry known among Malayali of Southern India as Moli.

References

External links
 Fish Molee recipe

Indian fish dishes
Malaysian cuisine
Singaporean cuisine
Portuguese fusion cuisine
Indian fusion cuisine